Dozens of fortifications were built in Cape Town and the Cape Peninsula between the 1650s and the 1940s.  Most have gone, but a few still stand.

List of fortifications
Entries in bold indicate that the building still stands, either intact or in ruins.

Dutch colonial period (1652–1795)

17th century
 Fort de Goede Hoop (1652–1674) – Table Bay (present Grand Parade)
 Tranenborg (1652–?) – Table Bay (Salt River mouth)
 Duynhoop (1654–1672) – Table Bay (Salt River mouth)
 :af:Coornhoop (1657–1662) – present-day Mowbray
 Kyckuyt (1659–1670s) – present-day Paarden Eiland
 Keert de Koe (1659–1670s) – present-day Maitland
 Houdt den Bul (1659–1663) – present-day Bishopscourt
 Ruyterwacht (1659–1660s) – present-day Rondebosch
 Santhoop (1661–?) – Table Bay (near Salt River mouth)
 Castle of Good Hope (born 1674) – Table Bay

18th century
 Chavonnes Battery (1726–1860) – Table Bay
 Fort De Knokke (1744–1926) – Table Bay
 Sea Lines (1744–1827) – Table Bay
 Imhoff Battery (1744–1896) – Table Bay (next to Castle)
 Muizenberg Fort (1740s–1827) – near present Natale Labia Art Museum
 French Lines (or Military Lines) (1781–1827) – present-day Trafalgar Park (Woodstock)
 Gordon Battery (c1781–?) – slopes of Devil's Peak
 Kloof Nek Battery (c1781–1827) – Kloof Nek (between Table Mountain and Lion's Head)
 Camps Bay Battery – present-day Camps Bay High School
 Conway Redoubt (c1781–?) – Constantia Nek
 Gilquin Battery (later West Fort) (1781–1827 – Hout Bay
 Zoutman Battery (later East Fort) (1781–1827 – Hout Bay
 Amsterdam Battery (1787–1900s) – Table Bay (near present V&A Waterfront entrance)
 Coehoorn Battery (1780s–?) – slopes of Devil's Peak
 Rogge Bay Battery (1780s–1827) – present St John's Arcade, Riebeeck Street
 Boetselaar Battery (1793–) – Simon's Town
 Zoutman Battery (later Lower North Battery) (1793–) – Simon's Town
 Klein Gibraltar (1794–1827) – Hout Bay
 Kyk in de Pot (1795–) – Table Bay (rebuilt as Fort Wynyard 1862)

British colonial period (1795–1910)

18th century
 Craig's Tower (1795–?) – near Salt River mouth
 York Blockhouse (later Queen's Blockhouse) (1795–1827) – Devil's Peak
 King's Blockhouse (1795–1827) – Devil's Peak
 Prince of Wales's Blockhouse (1795–1827) – Devil's Peak
 Martello Tower (born 1796) – Simon's Town

19th century
 Fort Wynyard (born 1862) – Table Bay
 Craig's Battery (1880s–?) – near Salt River mouth (replaced Craig's Tower)
 Green Point Battery (1880s–1907) – Mouille Point beachfront
 Three Anchor Bay Battery (1880s–1920s) – Three Anchor Bay beachfront
 Cemetery Battery (later Queen's Battery) (1889–1943) – Simon's Town
 Noah's Ark Battery (1890–1940s) – Simon's Town
 Sea Point Battery (1891–1928) – present Sea Point Junior School site
 Lion Battery (born 1891) – Signal Hill
 Middle North Battery (born 1892) – Simon's Town
 Upper North Battery (1895–?) – Simon's Town

20th century
 Scala Battery (1906–1947) – Simon's Town

Union/Republic of South Africa (1910–)

20th century

 King George V Battery (1914–1928) – Milnerton
 Duiker Battery (later Apostle Battery) (1940–) – Llandudno
 Cornelia Battery (1940–1944) – Robben Island (north)
 Robben Eiland Battery (later De Waal Battery) (1941–1944) – Robben Island (south)
 Docks Battery (later Duncan Battery) (1940–1946) – Table Bay

References
 Barker, B.J. (2003)  The Castle of Good Hope from 1666.
 Emms, M. (1976)  "Fortifications of the Cape of Good Hope" in Lantern (June 1976).
 Ras, A.C. (1959)  Die Kasteel en ander Vroeë Kaapse vestingwerke 1652–1713.
 Rosenthal, E. (1966)  Bastion of the South.
 Seemann, U.A. (1997)  Fortifications of the Cape Peninsula 1647–1829.
 Sleigh, D. (1996)  Forts of the Liesbeek Frontier.

See also
  Chavonnes Battery Museum
 Fort de Goede Hoop
  Fortress Study Group:  The Cape Town Guns
 Redout Duijnhoop
 List of Castles and Fortifications in South Africa

Castles in South Africa
History of Cape Town
Military history of South Africa
Forts in South Africa
Buildings and structures in Cape Town
Cape Peninsula